Microplutodes hilaropa is a species of moth of the family Geometridae first described by Edward Meyrick in 1897. It is found on Borneo and Sumatra.

References

Plutodini